Thailand first participated at the Youth Olympic Games in 2010, and has sent athletes to compete in every Summer Youth Olympic Games since then.

Medal tables

Medals by Summer Games

Medals by Winter Games

Medals by Summer Sport

Medals by Winter Sport

List of medalists

Medalists by Summer Games

Medalists by Summer Games in Mixed-NOCs Team

Flag bearers

Flag bearers by Summer Games

Flag bearers by Winter Games

Olympic participants

Summer Olympics

Winter Olympics

See also 

 Olympics
 Thailand at the Olympics
 Paralympic
 Thailand at the Paralympics
 Asian Games
 Thailand at the Asian Games
 Thailand at the Asian Para Games

 Other
 Thailand at the Universiade
 Thailand at the World Games

References

External links
 
 
 

 
Nations at the Youth Olympic Games